The Men's Macau Open 2013 is the men's edition of the 2013 Macau Open (squash), which is a tournament of the PSA World Tour event International (prize money: $50,000). The event took place in Macau in China from 17 October to 20 October. Omar Mosaad won his first Macau Open trophy, beating Adrian Grant in the final.

Prize money and ranking points
For 2013, the prize purse was $50,000. The prize money and points breakdown is as follows:

Seeds

Draw and results

See also
PSA World Tour 2013
Macau Open (squash)

References

External links
PSA Macau Open 2013 website

Squash tournaments in Macau
Macau Open
Macau Open (squash)